Nicola Fiorita (born 14 July 1969) is an Italian academic and politician, Mayor of Catanzaro since 2022.

Biography 
Son of Franco Fiorita, former mayor of Catanzaro, he graduated in law at the University of Florence and became a university professor at the University of Calabria, dealing with law and religion, secularism and European Islam.

Always close to the left, Fiorita has been a candidate in the local elections of 2017 for the office of mayor of Catanzaro leading a left-wing coalition and ranking third with a percentage of 23.23%.

Mayor of Catanzaro 
Following an agreement between the Democratic Party, Five Star Movement, Volt and other progressive movements, Fiorita became the official candidate of the centre-left coalition for the office of mayor of Catanzaro in the local elections of 2022. He was elected mayor in the second turn, defeating the centre-right candidate Valerio Donato, with a percentage of 58%, despite the lists in support of him appear to be in the minority in the city council due to the occurrence of the so-called lame duck.

References 

Living people
1969 births
21st-century Italian politicians
University of Florence alumni
Mayors of places in Calabria
People from Catanzaro